College des Garçons  is a college in Nouakchott, Mauritania. It is located opposite (west) to the Lycée d'Arabe and east of the National Guard complex.

References

Nouakchott
Universities in Mauritania